The Ministry of Finance is the government ministry of Guyana responsible for fostering economic development by managing and maintaining public finances and providing a positive framework for public and private initiatives. The ministry is located in the capital city, Georgetown.

List of ministers
The following is a list of finance ministers of Guyana.

Charles Ramkissoon Jacob, September 1961 - December 1964
Peter D'Aguiar, December 1964 - September 1967
Ptolemy Reid, September 1967 - December 1970
Hugh Desmond Hoyte, December 1970 - August 1972
Frank E. Hope, August 1972 - 1980
Hugh Desmond Hoyte, 1980 - 1983
Carl Barrington Greenidge, 1983 - 1992
Asgar Ally, 1992 - 1995
Bharrat Jagdeo, 1995 - 1999
Saisnarine Kowlessar, 1999 - 2006
Ashni Singh, September 2006 - May 2015
Winston Jordan, May 2015 - August 2020 
Bharrat Jagdeo, August 2020 - November 2020
Ashni Singh, November 2020 -

See also
Politics of Guyana

References

External links
Ministry of Foreign Affairs

Government of Guyana
Guyana